The National Democratic Rally or National Democratic Gathering (at-tajammuʻ al-waţanī ad-dīmūqrāţī) is a banned opposition alliance in Syria, comprising five political parties of a secularist, pan-Arabist, Arab nationalist and socialist bent.

Hassan Ismail Abdelazim, leader of the Democratic Arab Socialist Union, is the official spokesman of the Rally.

Member parties
The founding member parties were:
The Democratic Arab Socialist Union - a splinter of the Arab Socialist Union Party of Syria, formerly the main Nasserist party in Syria.
The Syrian Democratic People's Party - Riad al-Turk's group, formerly called the Syrian Communist Party - Political Bureau, and an offshoot of the Syrian Communist Party.
The Arab Revolutionary Workers Party - a leftist-Marxist offshoot of the Ba'ath Party from the 1960s, which for some time had active branches in Lebanon and Iraq as well.
The Arab Socialist Movement - an Arab socialist group with roots in Akram al-Hawrani's pre-Ba'ath peasant movement.
The Democratic Socialist Arab Ba'ath Party - a remnant of Salah Jadid's left-wing faction of the Ba'ath Party, led by his former Foreign Minister Ibrahim Makhous.

In 2006, a sixth party joined the coalition: 
The Communist Labour Party - the recreation of a hardline communist group repressed in the 1980s, which originally had its roots in 1970s Syrian student radicalism, with pro-Sandinista, Guevarist and Maoist tendencies.

History
The National Democratic Rally was formed in January 1980 by the five member parties listed above, and its membership has not changed since. In several cases these parties were originally opposition wings of parties that had joined the governing National Progressive Front, which is a leftist nationalist party coalition established under the leadership of the Syrian Ba'ath Party. A few parties also had sister parties or factions in other Arab states, such as Nasserist Egypt or Ba'athist Iraq. Its first spokesman was Democratic Arab Socialist Union chairman Jamal al-Atassi. At his death in the year 2000, his role was inherited by his successor at the helm of DASU, Hassan Ismail Abdelazim.

The Rally took part in the opposition movement of 1980 - a period of civil protest by leftist, Islamist, liberal and nationalist groups which coincided with an armed uprising by Islamists in the Muslim Brotherhood and more radical factions. This led to severe repression of the Rally by the Syrian government; several of its main leaders were given long prison sentences (e.g. Riad al-Turk, jailed 1980-98). The Rally was later active in the Damascus Spring of 2000, holding seminars and advocating political freedom. However, its member parties are now relatively marginal on the Syrian political scene, even if they remain an important segment of the organized opposition, due to decades of severe repression and denial of freedom to organize. Most leaders and many members are today old men, after joining or founding their respective parties in the early 1960s to late 1970s, and have had relatively poor success in appealing to younger generations of Syrians.

See also
Coalition of Secular and Democratic Syrians
Damascus Declaration
High Negotiations Committee
Movement for a Democratic Society
National Alliance for the Liberation of Syria
National Coalition for Syrian Revolutionary and Opposition Forces
National Coordination Committee for Democratic Change
Popular Front for Change and Liberation
Syrian National Democratic Council
Syrian National Council
Syrian Revolution General Commission

External links
National Democratic Gathering - website, Arabic/French. [last updated in 2004]

References

1980 establishments in Syria
Arab nationalism in Syria
Arab socialist political parties
Organizations of the Syrian civil war
Pan-Arabist political parties
Political opposition organizations
Political parties established in 1980
Political party alliances in Syria
Secularism in Syria
Socialist parties in Syria
Syrian opposition